Manara is the second short film directed by Lebanese filmmaker Zayn Alexander. It premiered in 2019 during the 76th Venice International Film Festival in the Giornate degli Autori section. The film was awarded the top prize at the 5th annual Laguna Sud - Il Cinema fuori dal Palazzo by a jury that included director Paola Randi, director of photography Valerio Azzali, and writer Franceso Targhetta.  It went on to win the "Ahmed Khedr Award for Excellence in Arab Filmmaking" at the 2020 ÉCU The European Independent Film Festival and "Best Narrative Short Film" at the 2020 Alexandria Short Film Festival in Egypt.

Plot
In a coastal town in Southern Lebanon, the Zayyad family seemed to have it all: A hotel by the sea, a lasting marriage, and strong family ties. But this seemingly perfect portrait takes a hit when the father dies under mysterious circumstances. Alia, the bereaved wife, is intent on lying about her husband’s cause of death in order to maintain appearances, despite the vehement objections of her adult children, Rami and Noura. One hour before the mourners’ arrival, and still struggling to agree on a course of action, Alia, Noura and Rami are forced to reevaluate the long dysfunctional family dynamic that brought them here in the first place.

Cast
 Zayn Alexander as Rami
 Pascale Seigneurie as Noura
 Hala Basma Safieddine as Alia

Themes
Alexander said he made the film to explore "the obsession with appearances in Lebanon" and "the lengths Lebanese families are willing to go to avoid embarrassment." Alexander and the film's writer, Seigneurie, who also co-stars, said the film's development was guided by their deep-rooted frustration with the psychological attitudes of the culture they grew up in. The film explores the stigma of mental health issues in Lebanon and the generational divide when it comes to mental health, grief, and family.  Alexander, who has a master's degree in psychology from Columbia University, wanted to explore the tensions families go through as they struggle with secrecy and shame.

Production
The bulk of the film was shot in two days in Tyre, Lebanon at the resort of Al Fanar. It is Alexander's second short film working with writer and actor Pascale Seigneurie, following their collaboration on Alexander's directorial debut Abroad (2018).

Reception

Critical reception 
The film debuted in Venice, Italy before appearing at festivals in Tunisia, France, and Egypt, winning several jury awards. The film received mostly positive reviews by critics at each stop along its festival tour. Lorna Codrai of Film Inquiry wrote that the film "does a wonderful job of examining a culture struggling with an increasing mental health crisis." Bianca Garner of In Their Own League wrote Manara is "a perfect example of how to carefully construct a short film narrative." Film critic Mazen Fawzy wrote that Manara is "a powerful film that successfully implicates the viewer and leaves room for varying interpretations." Adam Symchuk of Asian Movie Pulse gave the film a mixed review, but wrote "its strengths are still enough to put the short in high regard, and establishes director Zayn Alexander as a strong narrative storyteller."

Accolades

References

External links
 
 

2019 films
Lebanese short films
2019 short films
Lebanese drama films
2010s Arabic-language films
2019 drama films